The Capps House is a historic house in rural Monroe County, Arkansas. It is located in the southern part of the county, just east of Arkansas Highway 17 on the north side of County Road 48 (New Cutts Road).

Description and history 
It is a two-story brick I-house, oriented east–west. A porch across its front facade was reported in 1990 to be collapsed, while the northern porch retained original chamfered posts, despite having been screened. The property includes as outbuildings a small pumphouse and a barn, and includes the family cemetery of William T. Capps, who built this house around 1875. It is one of the best-preserved 19th-century I-houses in this part of the county.

The house was listed on the National Register of Historic Places on June 21, 1990.

See also
National Register of Historic Places listings in Monroe County, Arkansas

References

Houses on the National Register of Historic Places in Arkansas
Houses completed in 1875
Houses in Monroe County, Arkansas
National Register of Historic Places in Monroe County, Arkansas
I-houses in Arkansas